The 1969 Munster Senior Club Hurling Championship was the sixth staging of the Munster Senior Club Hurling Championship since its establishment by the Munster Council.

On 11 April 1971, Roscrea won the championship after a 3-06 to 1-09 defeat of Glen Rovers in the final at Seán Treacy Park. It was their first ever championship title.

Results

First round

Semi-finals

Final

References

External links
 Munster Senior Club Hurling Champions

1969 in hurling
1969 in Irish sport
Munster Senior Club Hurling Championship